Guillermo "Willie" Aubone (born 8 June 1954) is a former professional tennis player from Argentina.

Playing career
Before turning pro, Aubone played college tennis in the United States, at the University of Corpus Christi and University of South Carolina.

He had to face seeded players in the first round of all three of his Grand Slam singles appearances. At the 1980 US Open he faced world number one Björn Borg, then played against 12th seed Brian Gottfried in the 1981 French Open, before coming up against 16th seed Mel Purcell in the 1982 French Open. He lost each of those matches.

On the singles circuit, Aubone made one quarter-final, which at the British Hard Court Championships in 1981.

He had more success as a doubles player. In 1981 he reached four doubles semi-finals, partnering Wolfgang Popp in Bournemouth, Alejandro Pierola in Bordeaux, Billy Martin in Madrid and Andreas Maurer in Quito. The following year, at Vina Del Mar, he finally made it to a Grand Prix final, but he and partner Ángel Giménez were defaulted.

Coaching
Since 1983 he has been coaching in Miami, where he had his own tennis academy. He coached Mary Joe Fernández during her early professional career and spent time at the Nick Bollettieri Tennis Academy, as an instructor.

Grand Prix career finals

Doubles: 1 (0–1)

Challenger titles

Doubles: (1)

References

1954 births
Living people
Argentine male tennis players
Argentine tennis coaches
Tennis players from Buenos Aires